The Central District of Shush County is a district (bakhsh) in Shush County, Khuzestan Province, Iran. At the 2006 census, its population was 113,041, in 21,397 families.  The district has two cities: Shush and Horr.  The district has two rural districts (dehestan): Ben Moala Rural District and Hoseynabad Rural District.

References 

Shush County
Districts of Khuzestan Province